The Central District of Maragheh County is in East Azerbaijan province, Iran. At the National Census in 2006, its population was 205,137 in 53,098 households. The following census in 2011 counted 226,310 people in 64,918 households. At the latest census in 2016, the district had 240,972 inhabitants in 73,667 households.

References 

Maragheh County

Districts of East Azerbaijan Province

Populated places in East Azerbaijan Province

Populated places in Maragheh County